John Austin Gronouski Jr. (October 26, 1919January 7, 1996) was the Wisconsin state commissioner of taxation and served as the United States Postmaster General from 1963 until 1965 under Presidents John F. Kennedy and Lyndon B. Johnson.

Biography
Gronouski was born in Dunbar, Wisconsin, the son of Mary (Riley) and John Austin Gronouski. He was of Polish and Irish descent. He graduated from the University of Wisconsin in 1942, and he joined the military during World War II. Gronouski served as a navigator in the Air Force until October 1945.  Gronouski married the former Mary Louise Metz on January 24, 1948. They had two daughters, Stacy Ann Jennings and Julia Kay Glieberman.

He earned an M.A. in 1947 and a Ph.D. in 1955, both from the University of Wisconsin. In 1952, he ran for the United States Senate against Joseph McCarthy, who won reelection.  In 1959, Gronouski joined the Wisconsin Department of Revenue and was named the executive director of the Revenue Survey Commission.

In 1960, he became the Wisconsin state commissioner of taxation, and he supported John F. Kennedy for President.  In 1963 Gronouski was appointed Postmaster General, the first Polish-American Cabinet officer. As Postmaster General, Gronouski promoted the original five-digit zip code system, and worked to end racial discrimination against postal employees. After he left the Cabinet on November 2, 1965, President Lyndon B. Johnson appointed him to be Ambassador to Poland.

After President Richard M. Nixon took office in 1969, Gronouski became founding dean of the Lyndon B. Johnson School of Public Affairs at the University of Texas at Austin.  Gronouski served as dean until 1974. He served as a member of Eisenhower Commission (on international radio broadcasting) and as the Chairman of the Board for International Broadcasting during the Carter administration.

In retirement, Gronouski lived in Green Bay, Wisconsin, where he died on January 7, 1996. He is interred in Allouez Catholic Cemetery and Chapel Mausoleum in Green Bay, Wisconsin.

References

Archives of the Lyndon B. Johnson School of Public Affairs at The University of Texas at Austin
Lyndon Baines Johnson Library and Museum
New York Times obituary

External links

1919 births
1996 deaths
University of Wisconsin–Madison alumni
United States Army Air Forces personnel of World War II
People from Marinette County, Wisconsin
Politicians from Green Bay, Wisconsin
United States Postmasters General
Lyndon B. Johnson administration cabinet members
Kennedy administration cabinet members
20th-century American politicians
United States Army Air Forces officers
Ambassadors of the United States to Poland
American people of Irish descent
American people of Polish descent
Military personnel from Wisconsin
Burials in Wisconsin
Catholics from Wisconsin